Tolgahan Acar (born 4 June 1986) is a Turkish professional footballer who plays as a goalkeeper for the amateur side Adana 1954 FK. He has been capped at youth level for the U-18, U-19 and U-20 Turkey squads.

Early career
Acar was born in Adana. He attended and played football for the Çukurova Üniversitesi team. He moved to Adanaspor in 2002. In his first stint at the club, Acar was capped twice, spending the brunt of his time with the youth team. Gaziantepspor transferred him in 2004, but he did not feature for the club regularly.

Instead, Acar spent most of his time at the club either with the youth team or on loan at Adanaspor. Adanaspor transferred him at the beginning of the 2009 season. Acar was the starting goalkeeper for the Toros Kaplanları, playing in 32 matches in the 2009–10 season.

References

External links
 

1986 births
Living people
Sportspeople from Adana
Turkish footballers
Turkey youth international footballers
Association football goalkeepers
Adanaspor footballers
Gaziantepspor footballers
Göztepe S.K. footballers
Altınordu F.K. players
Sivasspor footballers
Denizlispor footballers
Giresunspor footballers
Şanlıurfaspor footballers
Süper Lig players
TFF First League players
TFF Second League players